St. Hanshaugen Park is a large public park located just north of the city center of Oslo, Norway. It is a classic urban park located within the borough of St. Hanshaugen, which was named for the park which lies within its center. Nearby are  Bislett Stadium and Alexander Kiellands plass.

Description
St. Hanshaugen Park has a mixture of intimate and romantic areas together with rolling hills which provide  picturesque and  scenic views to downtown Oslo. The park has a reflecting pool covering a reservoir.  Through the years, a number of statues were also placed in the park. The park also has a groundskeepers house, an artificial creek and a pavilion on the square Festplassen. St. Hanshaugen Park has a stage used for outdoor concerts and entertainment which is quite popular.  St. Hanshaugen Park is also the site of Kongene på Haugen festivalen, an annual local music festival.

History
The park location was originally a bare rock hill. During the 1840s, inhabitants of Oslo began to use the site of the future park as location for their Midsummer Eve  bonfire. St. Hans is a Norwegian term for Midsummer Eve while haugen (from Old Norse haugr) refers to a hill. 

Fritz Heinrich Frølich (1807-1877) first initiated development of St. Hanshaugen Park around 1850. Frølich  was a successful banker who served as director of Christiania Bank.  He was a key figure in the business and community life of Christiania (now Oslo) during the mid 1800s. From 1843 until his death, Frølich was also a prominent member of the city council.

During the middle of the 1860s,  over one thousand trees were planted creating the first major park outside the city center. Starting in 1867, the city took responsibility for the park and the last major works were carried out in the years 1876–1890.  The final part of the park was added with purchases of land in 1909.<ref>[http://www.visitnorway.com/en/Product/?pid=28917Visit Norway – Oslo]</ref>

Notable StatuesPeter Chr. Asbjørnsen by Brynjulf Bergslien (1885)Kvinne  by Ørnulf Bast (1947)Musikanter by Arne Vinje Gunnerud (1970)Svane by Arne Durban (1981)Løvinne med unger'' by H. Stuetzer  (1891)

Gallery

See also
St. Hanshaugen  borough of the city of Oslo, Norway
Parks and open spaces in Oslo

References

External links

Wikimapia – St. Hanshaugen
Kongene på Haugen festivalen Norwegian
Nature Guide to St.Hanshaugen Park Norwegian
Map of Christiania (now Oslo) from 1887

Music festivals in Oslo
Parks in Oslo